This table displays the top-rated primetime television series of the 1958–59 season as measured by Nielsen Media Research.

References

1958 in American television
1959 in American television
1958-related lists
1959-related lists
Lists of American television series